The Inhuman is a Canadian psychological thriller film, directed by Jason Brennan and released in 2021. Based on the Algonquin legend of the wendigo, the film stars Samian as Mathieu, a successful but troubled neurosurgeon whose life is falling apart, who confronts a wendigo when he returns to his childhood home of Kitigan Zibi for the first time in decades following his father's death.

The cast also includes Véronique Beaudet, Jeanne Roux-Côté, Sonia Vigneault, Julie Barbeau, Creed Commando, Phil Macho Commando, Andrew Dewache, Karl Farah, Lili Gagnon, Louis Gallant, Caroline Gelinas, Chloé Germentier, Richard Jutras, Neil Kroetsch, Pierre-Michel Le Breton, Brittany LeBorgne and Angela McIlroy-Wagar.

According to Brennan, the film was meant to explore the idea, present in some but not all versions of wendigo mythology, that the wendigo is not so much a supernatural being as a personification of a person's own inner demons.

The film premiered on October 31, 2021, at the Abitibi-Témiscamingue International Film Festival, before going into commercial release in April 2022.

Awards
The film was screened at the 2022 American Indian Film Festival, where Samian won the award for Best Actor and Brennan won the award for Best Director.

References

External links
 

2021 films
2021 thriller films
Canadian thriller films
Films shot in Quebec
Films set in Quebec
Quebec films
First Nations films
French-language Canadian films
2020s Canadian films
Wendigos in popular culture